Martín and Pablo Cuevas were the defending champions but only Martín Cuevas chose to defend his title, partnering Luis David Martínez. Cuevas lost in the semifinals to Sander Arends and David Pel.

Romain Arneodo and Jonathan Eysseric won the title after defeating Arends and Pel 7–5, 4–6, [10–4] in the final.

Seeds

Draw

References

External links
 Main draw

Open Sopra Steria de Lyon - Doubles
2022 Doubles